Ludwig Forrer (9 February 1845 – 28 September 1921) was a Swiss politician and member of the Swiss Federal Council (1902–1917).

Forrer was born in Islikon. He was elected to the Swiss Federal Council on 11 December 1902 and handed over office on 31 December 1917. He was affiliated to the Free Democratic Party. 

During his office time he held the following departments:
 Department of Trade, Industry and Agriculture (1903)
 Department of Home Affairs (1904–1905)
 Political Department (1906) as President of the Confederation
 Military Department (1907)
 Department of Justice and Police (1908)
 Department of Posts and Railways (1908–1911)
 Political Department (1912) as President of the Confederation
 Department of Posts and Railways (1913–1917)
He was President of the Confederation twice in 1906 and 1912.

External links

Ludwig Forrer in History of Social Security in Switzerland

1845 births
1921 deaths
People from Frauenfeld District
Swiss Calvinist and Reformed Christians
Free Democratic Party of Switzerland politicians
Members of the Federal Council (Switzerland)
Members of the National Council (Switzerland)
Presidents of the National Council (Switzerland)
University of Zurich alumni
Foreign ministers of Switzerland